The All-Ireland Senior Hurling Championship 1934 was the 48th series of the All-Ireland Senior Hurling Championship, Ireland's premier hurling knock-out competition.  Limerick won the championship, beating Dublin 5-2 to 2-6 in a replay of the final.

Format

The All-Ireland Senior Hurling Championship was run on a provincial basis as usual.  All games were played on a knockout basis whereby once a team lost they were eliminated from the championship.  The format for the All-Ireland series of games ran as follows: 
 The winners of the Leinster Championship advanced directly to the All-Ireland final.
 The winners of the Munster Championship advanced directly to a lone All-Ireland semi-final.
 Galway, a team who faced no competition in the Connacht Championship, entered the championship at the All-Ireland semi-final stage where they played the Munster champions.
 There were no representatives from the Ulster Championship in the All-Ireland series.

Results

Leinster Senior Hurling Championship

Munster Senior Hurling Championship

All-Ireland Senior Hurling Championship

Semi-final

Finals

Championship statistics

Scoring

Widest winning margin: 18 points
Dublin 5-4 : 0-1 Meath (Leinster semi-final, 24 June 1934)
Most goals in a match: 14
Meath 8-3 : 6-2 Wexford (Leinster quarter-final, 6 May 1934)
Most points in a match: 12
Limerick 4-8 : 2-5 Waterford (Munster final, 22 July 1934)
Most goals by one team in a match: 8
Meath 8-3 : 6-2 Wexford (Leinster quarter-final, 6 May 1934)
Most goals scored by a losing team: 5
Wexford 6-2 : 8-3 Meath (Leinster quarter-final, 6 May 1934)
Most points scored by a losing team: 6
Tipperary 5-6 : 7-5 Cork (Munster quarter-final, 10 June 1934)
Dublin 2-6 : 5-2 Limerick (All-Ireland final, 2 September 1934)

Miscellaneous

On 3 June three-in-a-row hopefuls Kilkenny set sail for the United States where they took part in a series of exhibition games.  The team returned home on 14 July and resumed their participation on the Leinster Championship.

Golden Jubilee
The All-Ireland Senior Hurling Championship 1934 marked the fiftieth anniversary of the foundation of the Gaelic Athletic Association.

In honour of the golden jubilee a special set of All-Ireland medals were struck and presented to the championship winner, and a postage stamp was issued on 27 July 1934, which was designed by Richard King (artist)."They were all delighted in Limerick over the G.A.A. Jubilee Stamp. They regard it as an omen that the colours chosen for the jersey of the hurler depicted on the stamp are those of the winners of the 1934 All-Ireland".

See also

 James Andrew Walsh (hurler)
 Patrons of the GAA prior to 1934 (Irish Independent Golden Jubilee Supplement, 1934)

References

Sources

 Corry, Eoghan, The GAA Book of Lists (Hodder Headline Ireland, 2005).
 Donegan, Des, The Complete Handbook of Gaelic Games (DBA Publications Limited, 2005).

1934